Pow is a surname. Notable people with the surname include:

 Duncan Pow (born 1980), Scottish actor
 Rebecca Pow (born 1960), British politician
 Robert Pow (1883–1958), Canadian politician
 Shane Pow (born 1990), Singaporean actor